Antonio Tejero Molina (born 30 April 1932) is a Spanish former Lieutenant Colonel of the Guardia Civil, and the most prominent figure in the failed coup d'état against the newly democratic Spanish government on 23 February 1981.

Career
Tejero entered the Guardia Civil in 1951 with the rank of Lieutenant and assigned to a post in Catalonia. In 1958, he was promoted to Captain and posted successively to Galicia, Vélez-Málaga and the Canary Islands. In 1963, he was promoted to Major, and served in Las Palmas de Gran Canaria and Badajoz. In 1974, he became a Lieutenant Colonel, serving as the leader of the Comandancia in the Basque province of Guipúzcoa, but had to ask to be transferred to another region when his public declarations against the Basque flag, the Ikurriña, became known. For his accomplishments in the Basque country, and in combating ETA, he was named Chief of the Planning Staff of the Civil Guard in Madrid. But during his career, he had also begun to accumulate a record of dissent. ETA militants would rig bombs to Ikurriñas; when police officers tried to remove the flag, the bombs exploded, killing several Guardia Civil officers. When the Ikurriña was 'legalized', he sent a telegram to Madrid, asking if he should pay honors to the Ikurriña. In Malaga, he ordered or took a major part in a military deployment around the town during the seizure of a flag.

In 1978, Tejero, along with Police Captain Ricardo Sáenz de Ynestrillas and an Army General Staff colonel, whose name was never made public, attempted a coup, known as Operation Galaxia. Tejero was sentenced to a short prison term for mutiny after the collapse of the attempted coup. He was in prison seven months and seven days.

Attempted 1981 coup

On 23 February 1981, Tejero entered the Congress of Deputies, the lower house of the Spanish Parliament, with 150 Guardia Civil members and soldiers and held the congress members hostage for some 22 hours. Around midnight, when it became clear that no further army units had joined the putsch, King Juan Carlos gave a nationally televised address denouncing the coup and urging the preservation of law and continuance of the democratically elected government. The following day, coup leaders surrendered to the police. Tejero made the following statement: "We received a country in perfect condition; we are obliged to hand it to our offspring in the same condition".

Life after jail sentence
Held in jail after the coup attempt, Tejero founded the Spanish Solidarity party to run in the 1982 general election and obtain parliamentary immunity. With a nationwide total of  votes (0.14% of votes cast), the party failed to obtain parliamentary representation. Tejero was the last of the coup participants to be released from jail on 3 December 1996, having then served 15 years in the Alcalá de Henares military prison. He lived in Torre del Mar in the Province of Málaga. In 2006, he wrote to the newspaper Melilla Hoy, calling for a referendum on Spanish Socialist Workers' Party (PSOE) proposals granting a new measure of autonomy to Catalonia. Following the death of Chilean dictator Augusto Pinochet in 2006, Tejero attended a Pinochet homage in Madrid. In 2009, Tejero's son, Ramón Tejero Díez, wrote to the conservative newspaper ABC describing his father as a sincere religious man who was trying to do his best for Spain.

As of 2018, Tejero resides in Madrid and Torre del Mar, and works as a painter. On 23 February 2018, he attended the funeral of the 1st Duchess of Franco. On 29 May 2018, a rumour of Tejero's death was spread by Spanish military veterans and supporters, but was quickly refuted by his son.

References

External links

Antonio Tejero at Encyclopædia Britannica

1932 births
Living people
People from the Province of Málaga
Spanish police officers
Far-right politicians in Spain
Falangist politicians
Francoists
Neo-fascist politicians